Shane Paul (born 25 January 1987 in Walsall) is an English footballer who last played for Halesowen Town in 2008.

Paul, a former Aston Villa trainee, has represented England at U16, U17 and U18 level. Also, Paul became professional in January 2004.

He left Aston Villa in 2006 after forging a name for himself on the youth international scene, representing England at various  tournaments. Paul's talents led him to be named top goalscorer in the 2003–04 UEFA Under-17 European Championships- and although a promising football career seemed likely he was hampered by injury, joining Scunthorpe United after a trial period at Wycombe Wanderers. Paul signed a short-term contract with Cheltenham Town after joining the League One side on trial in October 2007. Paul was making good progress in the 2007–08 season with Halesowen Town until breaking his leg in two places in the early stages of a game against Banbury United. At the time, it was not known if he would be able to play football again.

References

External links
 England FA profile

1987 births
Living people
Sportspeople from Walsall
English footballers
Association football forwards
England youth international footballers
Aston Villa F.C. players
Scunthorpe United F.C. players
Cheltenham Town F.C. players
Halesowen Town F.C. players